Joe Tracini (born Joe James Pasquale; 19 July 1988) is an English actor, presenter and author. He appeared in the role of Dennis Savage in the Channel 4 soap opera Hollyoaks. His previous TV acting credits have included the BBC Three comedy series Coming of Age and the Boomerang children's sitcom My Spy Family. His theatre credits include Spamalot, starring in the role of Patsy during a touring version of the production in 2015. In 2022, he published his first book, Ten Things I Hate About Me.

Early life
Joe Tracini was born in Great Yarmouth, Norfolk, the son of comedian Joe Pasquale and his second wife, Debbie Pasquale. The family subsequently moved to Kent and Joe was brought up in Higham, near Rochester. He was educated at King's School, Rochester and the Rochester Independent College. Having finished school, Tracini joined the Italia Conti Academy of Theatre Arts in London where he completed a National Diploma in Performing Arts in early 2007. As well as being an actor, Tracini also trained as a magician, having taken an interest in magic at the age of two. In 2003, he received the title of ‘British Junior Magical Champion’ which he won at the Blackpool Opera House in front of 3,000 international magicians. At the same time he also won the title of ‘Most Promising Comedy Act of 2003’, chosen and presented by Ken Dodd, as well as coming third in The Magic Circle's 'Young Magician Of The Year' competition.

Acting career

Theatre
Tracini's first theatre appearance came in a Christmas 2005 pantomime version of Snow White and the Seven Dwarfs at the Cliffs Pavilion in Southend. The following year, having started his studies at the Italia Conti Academy of Theatre Arts, he went on to perform in a number of their in-house productions including A Chorus Line and Sexual Perversity in Chicago, as well as a tour version of Richard III, in which he portrayed the title character. In 2007, he returned to the pantomime stage to take on the title role in Peter Pan at the Churchill Theatre in Bromley. A year later he reprised the role, this time at the Beck Theatre in Hayes alongside Leslie Grantham in the role of Captain Hook. By 2009, despite a heavy filming schedule with Coming of Age and My Spy Family, he once again returned to the stage to take on the role of Buttons in Cinderella at The Hawth in Crawley where he received rave reviews from the local media.

Having taken a year off in 2010, he returned to pantomime in 2011 playing the role of Wishee Washee in Aladdin alongside Larry Lamb at the Ashcroft Theatre in Croydon. The following year, Tracini returned to the role of Buttons, this time at the Barbican Centre in York alongside his close friend Dani Harmer and ex-EastEnders star Joe Swash. Due to his filming schedule for Hollyoaks, he again took a break from the pantomime stage in 2013, however having completed his work with the soap, he returned to the stage in November 2014, once again reprising the role of Buttons in Cinderella at Wolverhampton's Grand Theatre alongside Julian Clary and The X Factor (UK series 4) star Niki Evans. In early April 2015, it was confirmed that Tracini would be taking over from Todd Carty in the role of Patsy in the UK tour of Spamalot. The musical's cast already included his father, Joe Pasquale, who had extended his run starring as King Arthur.

Television
His television career started in 2004 when he was a guest on CITV STEM show Prove It!. He fully made his television debut in 2007 as Spike Bannon in My Spy Family airing on Boomerang. Following the success of the first series, he would go on to reprise his role in both the second and third series before the show eventually ended in January 2010. In 2007, Tracini was also cast in the role of Darren 'DK' Karrimore in a pilot for the new BBC Three situation comedy Coming of Age. The first series, airing in 2008 was well received enjoying an average weekly reach of 1.2 million. Subsequent second and third series followed, where Tracini continued to gain plaudits for his outlandish performances, however in 2011 the decision was made to axe the show. In 2010, Tracini also played the role of Victor in the single series of the BBC Four comedy The Great Outdoors.

In August 2011, it was announced that Tracini would be joining the cast of long-running Channel 4 soap Hollyoaks in the role of Dennis Savage. Like Lee Hunter, Dennis was primarily intended to take on comedic storylines. His first appearance was broadcast on 11 November 2011. After only six months in the role, Tracini was nominated for Best Comedy Performance at the British Soap Awards 2012, but was beaten to the award by Coronation Street's Stephanie Cole. Later that year Tracini was nominated for "Funniest Male" at the Inside Soap Awards 2012, but missed out on that award too, being beaten by EastEnders's Ricky Norwood. For the following two years, Tracini was again nominated in the same category, but on both occasions lost out to Coronation Street'''s Simon Gregson. In April 2014 it was announced that he would be leaving the soap with his final scenes broadcast in November of that year. In total, he appeared in 165 episodes. He will return to Hollyoaks in August 2018 for a brief stint. From 2017 to present, Tracini  hosts the CBBC DIY series The Dengineers with Lauren Layfield, he replaced Mark Wright in series 3.

 Film 
Away from television roles, he also played the title role in Roderick Fenske's short film Future Dave, and took on the role of Tony Blackburn alongside Keith Chegwin and Susannah Fielding in the British comedy horror film Kill Keith''.

Personal life 
In 2019, Tracini revealed over Twitter that he had been struggling with addiction issues and had been diagnosed with Borderline Personality Disorder.

References

External links

1988 births
Living people
Alumni of the Italia Conti Academy of Theatre Arts
British people of Italian descent
English male soap opera actors
English male stage actors
People from Great Yarmouth
People with borderline personality disorder
People from Higham, Kent